Ian Peter Shields (born 31 October 1979) is a former Irish first-class cricketer.

Born at Comber in October 1979, Shields was educated at Regent House School in Newtownards, before going up to Ulster University. He made his debut in first-class cricket for Ireland against Scotland at Belfast in 1999. He was captain of the Ireland under-19 squad for the 2000 Under-19 Cricket World Cup in Sri Lanka, playing in seven matches at the tournament. He made a second first-class appearance for Ireland against Scotland at Alloway in 2000, in what was the final annual first-class match played between the teams. In two first-class matches, Shields scored 54 runs, with a high score of 31 as an opening batsman alongside Dominick Joyce in the 2000 fixture. Outside of cricket, he runs a sports goods business.

References

External links

1979 births
Living people
People from Comber
Alumni of Ulster University
Cricketers from Northern Ireland
Irish cricketers